The Libra Party or Equal List is a political party in Albania. It was founded in 2016.

History

The party was founded by Ben Blushi, a prominent politician/writer, and Mimoza Hafizi; both former MPs of the Socialist Party of Albania. They left the Socialist Party after months of discussions with the leader Edi Rama and opposed the government's decisions. The pair wanted elections to be held within the party to elect a new leader. In October 2016, after leaving the party they created LIBRA, which in Albanian is an acronym for 'Lista e Barabartë' (The equal list).

Currently both Ben Blushi and Mimoza Hafizi serve as Members of the National Assembly from the LIBRA Party.

Ideology
Libra means Knowledge, Freedom and Balance. It is a centre-left political party with centrist tendencies, which promotes equality and human rights. Social liberalism, civic nationalism and pro-Europeanism are its 3 main ideologies. It promotes democracy and education and believes that all people should be treated as equal. The main goal is to help reduce poverty and to create a society that lives in harmony and justice.

Leader

Parliamentary representation

References

External links 
 

2016 establishments in Albania
Civic nationalism
Political parties established in 2016
Political parties in Albania
Pro-European political parties in Albania